Mauritel is a principal telecommunications company in Mauritania established in 1999 in Nouakchott.

External links
Mauritel  
Mauritania Phonebook Dot Com 

Companies of Mauritania
Telecommunications companies of Mauritania
Maroc Telecom